The , is the member of the Cabinet of Japan in charge of the Consumer Affairs Agency. The position was created along with the agency on September 1, 2009. As of September 11, 2019, the current minister is Seiichi Eto.

References